Jordan Brown (born March 26, 1996) is an American football cornerback who is a free agent. He played college football at South Dakota State and was drafted by the Cincinnati Bengals in the seventh round of the 2019 NFL Draft. He has also been a member of the Jacksonville Jaguars, Oakland Raiders, and Washington Football Team.

Professional career

Cincinnati Bengals
Brown was drafted by the Cincinnati Bengals in the seventh round (223rd overall) of the 2019 NFL Draft. He was waived during final roster cuts on August 31, 2019.

Jacksonville Jaguars
On October 30, 2019, Brown was signed to the Jacksonville Jaguars practice squad. He was released on November 26, 2019.

Oakland / Las Vegas Raiders
On December 4, 2019, Brown was signed to the Oakland Raiders practice squad. On December 30, 2019, Brown was signed to a reserve/future contract. He was waived on August 3, 2020. He was re-signed to the Raiders' practice squad on September 6, 2020. He was released on September 17.

Washington Football Team
On November 2, 2020, Brown was signed to the Washington Football Team's practice squad. On January 11, 2021, Brown signed a reserve/futures contract with the team; but was released on August 24, 2021.

Las Vegas Raiders (second stint)
On September 1, 2021, Brown was signed to the Las Vegas Raiders practice squad. After the Raiders were eliminated in the 2021 Wild Card round of the playoffs, he signed a reserve/future contract on January 17, 2022. On March 25, 2022, the Raiders cut Brown.

New Orleans Saints
On August 8, 2022, Brown signed with the New Orleans Saints. He was waived/injured a week later and placed on injured reserve. He was released on August 22. He was re-signed to the practice squad on October 4. He was released on November 1.

References

External links
 South Dakota State bio

1996 births
Living people
Players of American football from Scottsdale, Arizona
American football cornerbacks
South Dakota State Jackrabbits football players
Cincinnati Bengals players
Jacksonville Jaguars players
Las Vegas Raiders players
Oakland Raiders players
Washington Football Team players
New Orleans Saints players